Bagnan Assembly constituency is an assembly constituency in Howrah district in the Indian state of West Bengal.

Overview
As per orders of the Delimitation Commission, No. 180 Bagnan Assembly constituency  is composed of the following: Bagnan II community development block, and Bagnan I, Bagnan II, Bangalpur, Haturia I, Haturia II and Khalore gram panchayats of Bagnan I community development block.

Bagnan Assembly constituency is part of No. 26 Uluberia (Lok Sabha constituency).

Members of Legislative Assembly

Election results

2011
West Bengal assembly elections 2011gird.to expt@*19.

 

.# Swing calculated on Congress+Trinamool Congress vote percentages taken together in 2006.

1977-2006
In the 2006 state assembly elections, Akkel Ali Khan of CPI(M) won the Bagnan assembly seat, defeating his nearest rival Arup Roy of Trinamool Congress. Contests in most years were multi cornered but only winners and runners are being mentioned. Nirupama Chatterjee of CPI(M) defeated Sabuj Dutta of Trinamool Congress in 2001. Sabuj Dutta of Congress defeated Nirupama Chatterjee of CPI(M) in 1996. Nirupama Chatterjee of CPI(M) defeated Sanat Kumar Misra of Congress in 1991, and Susanta Bhattacharjee of Congress in 1987, 1982 and 1977.

1951-1972
Susanta Bhattacharjee of Congress won in 1972. Nirupama Chatterjee of CPI(M) won in 1971 and 1969. Ranjit Kumar Ghosh Choudhury of Congress won in 1967 and 1962. Amal Kumar Ganguli of CPI won in 1957. In independent India's first election in 1951, Sambhu Charan Mukhopadhyay of Congress won the Bagnan seat.

References

2016

Assembly constituencies of West Bengal
Politics of Howrah district
1952 establishments in West Bengal
Constituencies established in 1952